Tom Adkins (born January 13, 1958) is an American political pundit, political writer, TV personality, and real-estate investor. He is the host and producer of "Tommy's Garage," a lampoon show targeting politics and pop culture characters.

Political writing
Tom Adkins political writing career began as a prolific letters-to-the-editor campaign to The Philadelphia Inquirer. Inquirer editors eventually asked him to contribute op-ed pieces, and Adkins became notorious for attacking controversial subjects with a hard-right, confrontational approach. Several of his articles were picked up nationally, along with viral internet distribution. Dissatisfied with the members-only process of selecting contributors by most national conservative publications, Adkins united with similarly disaffected conservative internet writers to form the web magazine "CommonConservative.com."

Notable articles include:
 ”Burn That Flag” has been republished for several years in Chicken Soup for the American Soul.
 "Traditional Mother and Father: Still the Best Choice for Children" is featured in Patterns For College Writing, America's most widely used primer for college freshman English composition instruction.
 "Sun Tzu and Four American presidents", comparison of Jimmy Carter, Ronald Reagan, George H. W. Bush and Bill Clinton through the eyes of Sun Tzu, author of The Art of War.
 "Strange Bedfellows", debates the unholy alliance between homosexual America and the Catholic Church.
 "Threats From Within" warns of excessive racial terrorist profiling, while ignoring possible American terrorists.

Eventually, Adkins writing gained national exposure and numerous republications in local and national magazines and newspapers. CommonConservative.com eventually folded as Adkins aimed his career towards radio and television appearances.

Television
Adkins' television appearances began on Politically Incorrect with Bill Maher in September 1999.

Adkins currently hosts "Tommy's Garage", a political/pop culture lampoon show.

Tea Party
Adkins is also known for his speeches at various Tea Party rallies, including at
Morristown Tea Party on July 4, 2009, and
again at Morristown on September 7, 2009.

Personal
Adkins was married to Fox News host Brenda Buttner from 2005–2010.

References

 Opinionet Bio Conservative Truth
 Thousands take part in 'tea party' protest against high taxes in Morristown NJ.Com article on Morristown Tea Party
 Spinsanity - Race and "Racial McCarthyism" Spinsanity exposé on Villanova race-baiting

External links 
 "Patterns For College Writing" 
  "Fresh Ink"
  "The Cost Of Freedom Oct 7"
  "The Cost Of Freedom Feb 19"
  "Tom Adkins Opinion Net Bio"

1958 births
Living people
American political commentators